Mark Machado, better known as Mr. Cartoon or more commonly just Cartoon, is an American tattoo artist and graffiti artist based in Los Angeles, California. Growing up in the Harbor area of Los Angeles County, young Cartoon began airbrushing T-shirts and Lowrider cars before adopting the "Fineline Style" tattoo art style, which was developed in the California prison system.

Machado designed the logo for Cypress Hill and Eminem's Shady Records. He has tattooed the bodies of Bully Ray, Kobe Bryant, Dr. Dre, 50 Cent, Eminem, Method Man, Xzibit, Prodigy, DJ Premier, Travis Barker, Scott Raynor, Bow Wow, Freddie Ljungberg, Justin Timberlake, Beyoncé Knowles, Danny Trejo, Adil Omar, Mena Suvari, Jules Jordan, Emilio Rivera, Kurt Sutter, Redman, Lewis Hamilton, and Gabriel McDonald as well as Snoop Dogg.

In addition to tattoos, Machado's work has been used by Nike, Toyota, T-Mobile, MetroPCS, the Los Angeles Kings, the Los Angeles Clippers, Modelo, and in Grand Theft Auto. Machado appeared in the documentary Scarface: Origins of a Hip Hop Classic and is a contributor to Mass Appeal Magazine. Together with friend and frequent collaborator Estevan Oriol, he owns Joker Brand Clothing. In 2020, Cartoon starred in and was the focus of the Netflix documentary LA Originals, chronicling his and Oriol's lives as chicano creatives, ambassadors and trailblazers in art, hip-hop and counterculture worldwide. He, alongside Oriol, is a co-founder of Soul Assassin studios. In 2021, Constellation Brands featured him in one of their Fighting Spirit  Modelo Beer television commercials. 

Mister Cartoon worked on a special trading card project for the Topps company, depicting past and present players such as Mike Trout.

References

External links 
 
 Mister Cartoon Sanctiond
 Mister Cartoon interview
 Mister Cartoon Interview @ Inked Magazine

American graffiti artists
American tattoo artists
American artists of Mexican descent
Living people
Los Angeles Clippers
Year of birth missing (living people)